Praça da Liberdade (Liberty Square) is a principal square in the Savassi neighborhood in the city of Belo Horizonte, Minas Gerais, Brazil.

Geography of Belo Horizonte
Parks in Brazil
Tourist attractions in Belo Horizonte